Carroll Clark Hincks (November 30, 1889 – September 30, 1964) was a United States circuit judge of the United States Court of Appeals for the Second Circuit and previously was a United States District Judge of the United States District Court for the District of Connecticut.

Education and career 

Born on November 30, 1889, in Andover, Massachusetts, to Edward Hincks (who was on the faculty of Andover Theological Seminary) and Elizabeth Tyler Clark (the daughter of Charles P. Clark, former president of the New Haven Railroad), Hincks graduated from Phillips Andover Academy. He received an Artium Baccalaureus degree in 1911 from Yale University and a Bachelor of Laws in 1914 from Yale Law School. He entered private practice in New Haven, Connecticut from 1914 to 1916. He was a captain in the United States Army field artillery during World War I from 1917 to 1919. Hincks also served as an artillery officer in the Border Campaign of 1916. He returned to private practice in Waterbury, Connecticut with the firm of Meyer, Hincks & Traurig from 1919 to 1931.

Federal judicial service 

Hincks was nominated by President Herbert Hoover on December 15, 1930, to a seat on the United States District Court for the District of Connecticut vacated by Judge Warren Booth Burrows. He was confirmed by the United States Senate on January 13, 1931, and received his commission on January 24, 1931. He served as Chief Judge from 1948 to 1953. His service terminated on December 7, 1953, due to elevation to the Second Circuit.

Hincks received a recess appointment from President Dwight D. Eisenhower on October 3, 1953, to a seat on the United States Court of Appeals for the Second Circuit vacated by Judge Thomas Walter Swan. He was nominated to the same position by President Eisenhower on January 11, 1954. He was confirmed by the Senate on February 9, 1954, and received his commission on February 9, 1954. He assumed senior status on May 15, 1959. His service terminated on September 30, 1964, due to his death at Grace‐New Haven Community Hospital in New Haven.

Notable case 

Among Hincks' most notable cases on the district bench was the reorganization of the New Haven Railroad (1935–1947).

Other service 

According to Hincks' obituary in the New York Times, "Judge Hincks was active in Yale University affairs." He served as secretary of the committee charged with constructing the Yale Bowl and was active in Mory's.

Personal 

Hincks was married to Edith Walker Ney Hincks, who survived him.

References

External links 
 

1889 births
1964 deaths
United States Army personnel of World War I
Connecticut lawyers
Judges of the United States Court of Appeals for the Second Circuit
Judges of the United States District Court for the District of Connecticut
People from Andover, Massachusetts
United States Army officers
United States court of appeals judges appointed by Dwight D. Eisenhower
20th-century American judges
United States district court judges appointed by Herbert Hoover
Yale Law School alumni
Yale University alumni